Darío Isaac Figueredo Legal (born 2 July 1957 in Colonia Independencia) is a Paraguayan former right midfielder.

Honours

 Cerro Porteño
 Paraguayan Primera División: 1977
 Nacional
 Paraguayan División Intermedia: 1989

External links
 

1957 births
Living people
Paraguayan footballers
Paraguay international footballers
Association football midfielders
1983 Copa América players
Cerro Porteño players
Sportivo Luqueño players
Club Nacional footballers
Paraguayan Primera División players
People from Guairá Department